KMCK-FM (105.7 MHz) is a commercial radio station broadcasting a Top 40 (CHR) radio format. The station is licensed to Prairie Grove, Arkansas, and serves Northwest Arkansas.  It is known as "Power 105.7" and is owned by Cumulus Media.

KMCK has an effective radiated power (ERP) of 100,000 watts, the maximum for non-grandfathered FM stations.  The transmitter is off Liberty Avenue in Tontitown, Arkansas.  Its signal reaches parts of Arkansas, Oklahoma and Missouri.

History
It signed on the air in 1947 as KUOA-FM, owned by John Brown University in Siloam Springs, Arkansas.  It was originally powered at 2,600 watts, a fraction of its current output.

The station was previously known as “Night Flight 106” and later “K106” in 1981 running a Top 40 format. In the mid-1980s, the station’s format was updated to Hot Adult Contemporary. The station returned back to its Top 40 format on July 30, 1989.

References

External links
Power 105.7 official website

MCK-FM
Contemporary hit radio stations in the United States
Radio stations established in 1989
Cumulus Media radio stations